Evgenia Radanova (born 4 November 1977) is a Bulgarian female short track speed skater and racing cyclist who has participated in both the Summer and Winter Olympics. She was the world record holder in the 500 m short track distance with 43.671s, which she set in Calgary, Canada on 19 October 2001. In the Salt Lake City 2002 Winter Olympic games she won a silver medal at the same distance and a bronze at 1500m. In Athens 2004 Summer games she took part in cycling, but did not get a medal. In the 2010 Vancouver Olympics in the women's 500 m she ended up 7th.

Radanova currently trains in Italy, although most of her career she spent with Slavia Sofia Sports Club and the National Sports Academy in Sofia, Bulgaria. In the Academy she studied coaching. She weighs 65 kg and is 170 cm tall. Radanova has been severely injured at least twice, but has overcome the injuries to come back. In August 2014, Radanova was appointed as Bulgarian Minister of Youth and Sports on a temporary basis as part of the caretaker government of Georgi Bliznashki.

References

External links
 
 Speed skater Evgenia Radanova ready to raise new generation
 

1977 births
Living people
Bulgarian female short track speed skaters
Bulgarian female cyclists
Olympic cyclists of Bulgaria
Cyclists at the 2004 Summer Olympics
Olympic short track speed skaters of Bulgaria
Short track speed skaters at the 1994 Winter Olympics
Short track speed skaters at the 1998 Winter Olympics
Short track speed skaters at the 2002 Winter Olympics
Short track speed skaters at the 2006 Winter Olympics
Short track speed skaters at the 2010 Winter Olympics
Olympic medalists in short track speed skating
Olympic silver medalists for Bulgaria
Olympic bronze medalists for Bulgaria
Medalists at the 2002 Winter Olympics
Medalists at the 2006 Winter Olympics
Sportspeople from Sofia
Bulgarian female speed skaters
Universiade medalists in short track speed skating
World Short Track Speed Skating Championships medalists
Universiade gold medalists for Bulgaria
Competitors at the 1997 Winter Universiade
Competitors at the 1999 Winter Universiade
Competitors at the 2001 Winter Universiade